The Cășoaca Mare (also: Cașoca) is a left tributary of the river Buzău in Romania. It discharges into the Buzău in the village Cașoca.

References

Rivers of Romania
Rivers of Buzău County